Peace Aims Groups were groups active at the start of the Second World War that agitated for a negotiated peace with Germany.  They were usually from the left of the spectrum.

These included:

 Parliamentary Peace Aims Group
 Cambridge Peace Aims Group
 Anglican Peace Aims and the Christendom Group